Eugynothrips is a genus of thrips in the family Phlaeothripidae.

Species
 Eugynothrips adulator
 Eugynothrips brevisetis
 Eugynothrips coarctatus
 Eugynothrips conocephali
 Eugynothrips convolvens
 Eugynothrips decipiens
 Eugynothrips intorquens
 Eugynothrips manubrialis
 Eugynothrips pachypus
 Eugynothrips persimilis
 Eugynothrips priesneri
 Eugynothrips seticornis
 Eugynothrips sumatranus
 Eugynothrips susicola
 Eugynothrips tubifex
 Eugynothrips umbricornis

References

Phlaeothripidae
Thrips
Thrips genera